The Grumman F4F Wildcat is an American carrier-based fighter aircraft that entered service in 1940 with the United States Navy, and the British Royal Navy where it was initially known as the Martlet. First used by the British in the North Atlantic, the Wildcat was the only effective fighter available to the United States Navy and Marine Corps in the Pacific Theater during the early part of the Second World War. The disappointing Brewster Buffalo was withdrawn in favor of the Wildcat and replaced as aircraft became available.

US Navy pilots, including John "Jimmy" Thach, a pioneer of fighter tactics to deal with the A6M Zero, were greatly dissatisfied with the Wildcat's inferior performance against the Zero in the battles of the Coral Sea and Midway. The Wildcat has a claimed air combat kill-to-loss ratio of 5.9:1 in 1942 and 6.9:1 for the entire war.

Lessons learned from the Wildcat were later applied to the faster F6F Hellcat. While the Wildcat had better range and maneuverability at low speed, the Hellcat could rely on superior power and high speed performance to outperform the Zero. The Wildcat continued to be built throughout the remainder of the war to serve on escort carriers, where the larger and much heavier Hellcat could not be used.

Design and development

Grumman fighter development began with the two-seat Grumman FF biplane. The FF was the first U.S. naval fighter with a retractable landing gear. The wheels retracted into the fuselage, leaving the tires visibly exposed, flush with the sides of the fuselage. Two single-seat biplane designs followed, the F2F and F3F, which established the general fuselage outlines of what would become the F4F Wildcat. In 1935, while the F3F was still undergoing flight testing, Grumman started work on its next biplane fighter, the G-16. At the time, the U.S. Navy favored a monoplane design, the Brewster F2A-1, ordering production early in 1936. However, an order was also placed for Grumman's G-16 (given the navy designation XF4F-1) as a backup in case the Brewster monoplane proved to be unsatisfactory.

It was clear to Grumman that the XF4F-1 would be inferior to the Brewster monoplane, so Grumman abandoned the XF4F-1, designing instead a new monoplane fighter, the XF4F-2. The XF4F-2 would retain the same, fuselage-mounted, hand-cranked main landing gear as the F3F, with its relatively narrow track. The unusual manually-retractable main landing gear design for all of Grumman's U.S. Navy fighters up to and through the F4F, as well as for the amphibious Grumman J2F utility biplane, was originally created in the 1920s by Leroy Grumman for Grover Loening. Landing accidents caused by failure of the main gear to fully lock into place were distressingly common.

The overall performance of Grumman's new monoplane was felt to be inferior to that of the Brewster Buffalo. The XF4F-2 was marginally faster, but the Buffalo was more maneuverable. The Buffalo was judged superior and was chosen for production. After losing out to Brewster, Grumman completely rebuilt the prototype as the XF4F-3 with new wings and tail and a supercharged version of the Pratt & Whitney R-1830 "Twin Wasp" radial engine. Testing of the new XF4F-3 led to an order for F4F-3 production models, the first of which was completed in February 1940. France also ordered the type, powered by a Wright R-1820 "Cyclone 9" radial engine, but France fell to the Axis powers before they could be delivered and the aircraft went instead to the British Royal Navy, who christened the new fighter the Martlet. The U.S. Navy officially adopted the aircraft type on 1 October 1941 as the Wildcat. The Royal Navy's and U.S. Navy's F4F-3s, armed with four .50 in (12.7 mm) Browning machine guns, joined active units in 1940.

On 16 December 1940, the XF4F-3 prototype, BuNo 0383, c/n 356, modified from XF4F-2, was lost under circumstances that suggested that the pilot may have been confused by the poor layout of fuel valves and flap controls and inadvertently turned the fuel valve to "off" immediately after takeoff rather than selecting flaps "up". This was the first fatality in the type.

Operational history

Even before the Wildcat had been purchased by the  U.S. Navy, the French Navy and the Royal Navy Fleet Air Arm (FAA) had ordered the Wildcat, with their own configurations, via the Anglo-French Purchasing Board.

Royal Navy

The F4F, initially known in British service as the Martlet, was taken on by the FAA as an interim replacement for the Fairey Fulmar. The Fulmar was a two-seat fighter with good range but operated at a performance disadvantage against single-seater fighters. Navalised Supermarine Spitfires were not available because of the greater need of the Royal Air Force. In the European theater, its first combat victory was on Christmas Day 1940, when a land-based Martlet destroyed a Junkers Ju 88 bomber over the Scapa Flow naval base. This was the first combat victory by a US-built fighter in British service in World War II.

The type also pioneered combat operations from the smaller escort carriers. Six Martlets went to sea aboard the converted former German merchant vessel  in September 1941 and shot down several Luftwaffe Fw 200 Condor bombers during highly effective convoy escort operations. These were the first of many Wildcats to engage in aerial combat at sea, including Convoy HG 76 to Gibraltar, in December 1941.

The British received 300 Eastern Aircraft FM-1s giving them the designation Martlet V in 1942–43 and 340 FM-2s, (having changed to using the same name as the US) as the Wildcat VI. Nearly 1,200 Wildcats were flown by the FAA and by January 1944, the Martlet name was dropped and the type was identified as the Wildcat. In March 1945, Wildcats shot down four Messerschmitt Bf 109s over Norway, the FAA's last Wildcat victories. 

The last air raid of the war in Europe was carried out by Fleet Air Arm aircraft in Operation Judgement on May 5, 1945. Twenty eight Wildcat VI aircraft from 846, 853 and 882 Naval Air Squadron, flying from escort carriers, took part in an attack on a U-boat depot near Harstad, Norway. Two ships and a U-boat were sunk with the loss of one Wildcat and one Grumman Avenger torpedo-bomber.

US Navy and Marine Corps

Pacific
The Wildcat was generally outperformed by the Mitsubishi Zero, its major opponent in the early part of the Pacific Theater but held its own partly because, with relatively heavy armor and self-sealing fuel tanks, the Grumman airframe could survive far more damage than its lightweight, unarmored Japanese rival. Many U.S. Navy fighter pilots were saved by the Wildcat's ZB homing device, which allowed them to find their carriers in poor visibility, provided they could get within the  range of the homing beacon. (However, the Zed Baker was wildly inconsistent in practice, especially during the Battle of Midway, when an entire squadron of Wildcats crashed in the sea after failing to locate their carriers).

In the hands of an expert pilot with a tactical advantage, the Wildcat could prove a difficult opponent even against the formidable Zero. After analyzing Fleet Air Tactical Unit Intelligence Bureau reports describing the new carrier fighter, USN Commander "Jimmy" Thach devised a defensive tactic that allowed Wildcat formations to act in a coordinated maneuver to counter a diving attack, called the "Thach Weave". The most widely employed tactic during the Guadalcanal Campaign was high-altitude ambush, where hit-and-run maneuvers were executed using altitude advantage. This was possible due to an early warning system composed of Coastwatchers and radar. On rare occasions, when Wildcats were unable to gain altitude in time, they would suffer many losses. On 2 October 1942, a Japanese air raid from Rabaul was not detected in time and the Cactus Air Force lost six Wildcats to only one Zero destroyed. During the most intense initial phase of the Guadalcanal Campaign, between 1 August and 15 November, combat records indicate that US lost 115 Wildcats and Japanese lost 106 Zeros to all causes; the Japanese lost many more pilots compared to the US.

Thach was greatly dissatisfied and a vocal critic of the Wildcat's performance during the war (as were many US carrier pilots), stating in his Midway action report;

Four U.S. Marine Corps Wildcats played a prominent role in the defense of Wake Island in December 1941. USN and USMC aircraft formed the fleet's primary air defense during the Battle of Coral Sea and the Battle of Midway and land-based Wildcats played a major role during the Guadalcanal Campaign of 1942–43. It was not until 1943 that more advanced naval fighters capable of taking on the Zero on more even terms, the Grumman F6F Hellcat and Vought F4U Corsair, reached the South Pacific theater.

The Japanese ace Saburō Sakai described the Wildcat's capacity to absorb damage:

Grumman's Wildcat production ceased in early 1943 to make way for the newer F6F Hellcat but General Motors continued producing Wildcats for U.S. Navy and Fleet Air Arm use. At first, GM produced the FM-1 (identical to the F4F-4 but with four guns). Production later switched to the improved FM-2 (based on Grumman's XF4F-8 prototype, informally known as the "Wilder Wildcat") optimized for small-carrier operations, with a more powerful engine and a taller tail to cope with the increased torque.

From 1943, Wildcats equipped with bomb racks were primarily assigned to escort carriers for use against submarines and attacking ground targets, though they would also continue to score kills against Japanese fighters, bombers and kamikaze aircraft. Larger fighters such as the Hellcat and the Corsair and dive bombers were needed aboard fleet carriers and the Wildcat's slower landing speed made it more suitable for shorter flight decks.

In the Battle off Samar on 25 October 1944, escort carriers of Task Unit 77.4.3 ("Taffy 3") and their escort of destroyers and destroyer escorts found themselves as the sole force standing between vulnerable troop transport and supply ships engaged in landings on the Philippine island of Leyte and a powerful Japanese surface fleet of battleships and cruisers. In desperation, lightly armed Avengers and FM-2 Wildcats from Taffys 1, 2 and 3 resorted to tactics such as strafing ships, including the bridge of the Japanese battleship , while the destroyers and destroyer escorts charged the enemy. Confused by the fierce resistance and having suffered significant damage, the Japanese fleet eventually withdrew from the battle.

Atlantic
U.S. Navy Wildcats participated in Operation Torch. USN escort carriers in the Atlantic used Wildcats until the end of the war. In October 1943 F4Fs participated in Operation Leader, an anti-shipping strike on Norway.

Totals
In all, 7,860 Wildcats were built. During the course of the war, Navy and Marine F4Fs and FMs flew 15,553 combat sorties (14,027 of these from aircraft carriers), destroying a claimed figure of 1,327 enemy aircraft at a cost of 178 aerial losses, 24 to ground/shipboard fire, and 49 to operational causes (an overall claimed kill-to-loss ratio of 6.9:1). True to their escort fighter role, Wildcats dropped only 154 tons of bombs during the war.

Variants

U.S. Navy Wildcats

F4F-1/-2
The original Grumman F4F-1 design was a biplane, which proved inferior to rival designs, necessitating a complete redesign as a monoplane named the F4F-2. This design was still not competitive with the Brewster F2A Buffalo which won initial U.S. Navy orders, but when the F4F-3 development was fitted with a more powerful version of the engine, a Pratt & Whitney Twin Wasp R-1830-76, featuring a two-stage supercharger, it showed its true potential.

F4F-3
U.S. Navy orders followed as did some (with Wright Cyclone engines) from France; these ended up with the Royal Navy's Fleet Air Arm after the fall of France and entered service on 8 September 1940. These aircraft, designated by Grumman as G-36A, had a different cowling from other earlier F4Fs and fixed wings, and were intended to be fitted with French armament and avionics following delivery. In British service initially, the aircraft were known as the Martlet I, but not all Martlets would be to exactly the same specifications as U.S. Navy aircraft. All Martlet Is featured the four .50 in (12.7 mm) M2 Browning machine guns of the F4F-3 with 450 rpg. The British directly ordered and received a version with the original Twin Wasp, but again with a modified cowling, under the manufacturer designation G-36B. These aircraft were given the designation Martlet II by the British. The first 10 G-36Bs were fitted with non-folding wings and were given the designation Martlet III. These were followed by 30 folding wing aircraft (F4F-3As) which were originally destined for the Hellenic Air Force, which were also designated Martlet IIIs. On paper, the designation changed to Martlet III(A) when the second series of Martlet III was introduced.

Poor design of the armament installation on early F4Fs caused these otherwise reliable machine guns to frequently jam, a problem common to wing-mounted weapons of many U.S. fighters early in the war. But contrasting with O'Hare's performance, his wingman was unable to participate because his guns would not function.

A shortage of two-stage superchargers led to the development of the F4F-3A, which was basically the F4F-3 but with a  Pratt & Whitney R-1830-90 radial engine with a more primitive single-stage two-speed supercharger. The F4F-3A would enter service as the Martlet III(B).

At the time of Pearl Harbor, only  had a fully equipped Wildcat squadron, VF-6 with F4F-3As. Enterprise was then transferring a detachment of VMF-211, also equipped with F4F-3s, to Wake.  was in San Diego, working up for operations of the F4F-3s of VF-3. 11 F4F-3s of VMF-211 were at the Ewa Marine Air Corps Station on Oahu; nine of these were damaged or destroyed during the Japanese attack. The detachment of VMF-211 on Wake lost seven Wildcats to Japanese attacks on 8 December, but the remaining five put up a fierce defense, making the first bomber kill on 9 December. The destroyer  was sunk by the Wildcats, and the Japanese invasion force retreated.

In May 1942, the F4F-3s of VF-2 and VF-42, aboard  and Lexington, participated in the Battle of the Coral Sea. During these battles, it became clear that attacks without fighter escort amounted to suicide, but that the fighter component on the carriers was completely insufficient to provide both fighter cover for the carrier and an escort for an attack force. Most U.S. carriers carried fewer than 20 fighters.

F4F-3P
In June 1942, 17 F4F-3s and one F4F-3A (18 total) were converted into F4F-3P photoreconnaissance planes. The F4F-3Ps were for short-range tactical reconnaissance, as their reserve fuel tanks were removed and replaced with Fairchild F-56 cameras. The F4F-3Ps retained their machine guns and were mainly flown by VMO-251 on air defense missions from Espiritu Santo in the South Pacific, arriving in July 1942. In October 1942, long-ranged and unarmed F4F-7s began replacing the F4F-3Ps, but a detachment of three F4F-3P from VMO-155 operated from the Bogue-class escort carrier USS Nassau (CVE-16) during the amphibious invasion of Attu Island in May 1943. Boston, MA, USA: Little, Brown and Co./Atlantic Monthly Press

F4F-3S "Wildcatfish"

This floatplane version of the F4F-3 was developed for use at forward island bases in the Pacific, before the construction of airfields. It was inspired by appearance of the A6M2-N "Rufe", a modification of the Mitsubishi A6M2 "Zeke". BuNo 4038 was modified to become the F4F-3S "Wildcatfish". Twin floats, manufactured by Edo Aircraft Corporation, were fitted. To restore the stability, small auxiliary fins were added to the tailplane. Because this was still insufficient, a ventral fin was added later.

The F4F-3S was first flown 28 February 1943. As the performance of the basic F4F-3 was already below that of the Zero, the F4F-3S was clearly of limited usefulness. In any case, the construction of the airfields at forward bases by the "Seabees" was surprisingly quick. Only one was converted.

F4F-4

A new version, the F4F-4, entered service in 1941 with six machine guns and the Grumman-patented Sto-Wing folding wing system, which allowed more aircraft to be stored on an aircraft carrier, increasing the number of fighters that could be parked on a surface by more than a factor of 2. The F4F-4 was the definitive version that saw the most combat service in the early war years, including the Battle of Midway. Navy F4F-3s were replaced by F4F-4s in June 1942. During the Battle of Midway, only VMF-221 still used F4F-3s. VF-42 of the Yorktown was the last carrier group converted to the F4F-4, and that was done as it left Pearl Harbor on the way to the Battle of Midway as VF-3 flew in new F4F-4s with Commander Thach.

The F4F-4 version was less popular with American pilots because the same amount of ammunition was spread over two additional guns, decreasing firing time. With the F4F-3's four .50 in (12.7 mm) guns and 450 rpg, pilots had 34 seconds of firing time; six guns decreased ammunition to 240 rpg, which could be expended in less than 20 seconds. The increase to six guns was attributed to the Royal Navy, who wanted greater firepower to deal with German and Italian foes. Jimmy Thach is quoted as saying, "A pilot who cannot hit with four guns will miss with eight." Moreover, the F4F-4's folding wing was intended to allow five F4F-4s to be stowed in the space required by two F4F-3s. In practice, the folding wings allowed an increase of about 50% in the number of Wildcats carried aboard U.S. fleet aircraft carriers. A variant of the F4F-4, designated F4F-4B for contractual purposes, was supplied to the British with a modified cowling and Wright Cyclone engine. These aircraft received the designation of Martlet IV.

F4F-5 Wildcat
Two F4F-3s (the 3rd and 4th production aircraft, BuNo 1846/1847) were fitted with a Wright R-1820-40 engine and designated XF4F-5.

FM-1/-2 Wildcat

General Motors / Eastern Aircraft produced 5,280 FM variants of the Wildcat. Grumman's Wildcat production ceased in early 1943 to make way for the newer F6F Hellcat, but General Motors continued producing Wildcats for both U.S. Navy and Fleet Air Arm use. Late in the war, the Wildcat was obsolescent as a front line fighter compared to the faster (380 mph/610 km/h) F6F Hellcat or much faster (446 mph/718 km/h) F4U Corsair. However, they were adequate for small escort carriers against submarine and shore threats. These relatively modest ships only carried two types of aircraft, the Wildcats and GM-built TBM Avengers. The Wildcat's lower landing speed and ability to take off without a catapult made it more suitable for shorter flight decks. At first, GM produced the FM-1, identical to the F4F-4, but reduced the number of guns to four, and added wing racks for two 250 lb (110 kg) bombs or six rockets. Production later switched to the improved FM-2 (based on Grumman's XF4F-8 prototype) optimized for small-carrier operations, with a more powerful engine (the  Wright R-1820-56), and a taller tail to cope with the torque.

F4F-7
The F4F-7 was a photoreconnaissance variant, with armor and armament removed. It had non-folding "wet" wings that carried an additional 555 gal (2,101 L) of fuel for a total of about 700 gal (2,650 L), increasing its range to 3,700 mi (5,955 km). A total of 21 were built.

F2M Wildcat

The F2M-1 was a planned development of the FM-1 by General Motors / Eastern Aircraft to be powered by the improved XR-1820-70 engine, but the project was cancelled before any aircraft were built.

Royal Navy Martlets

Martlet Mk I
The main difference with the basic model G-36 was due to the unavailability for export of the two-stage supercharged engine of F4F-3.

The G-36A also had French instruments (with metric calibration), radio and gunsight. The throttle was modified to conform to French pre-war practice: the throttle lever was moved towards the pilot (i.e. backward) to increase engine power. The armament which was to be fitted in France was six 7.5 mm (.296 in) Darne machine guns (two in the fuselage and four in the wings). The first G-36A was flown on 11 May 1940. After France's defeat in the Battle of France, all contracts were taken over by Britain. The throttle was modified again, four 0.50 in (12.7 mm) guns were installed in the wings and most traces of the original ownership removed.

The Martlets were modified for British use by Blackburn, which continued to do this for all later marks. British gunsights, catapult spools and other items were installed. After attempts to fit British radio sets, it was decided to use the superior American equipment. The first Martlets entered British service in August 1940, with 804 Naval Air Squadron, stationed at Hatston in the Orkney Islands. The Martlet Mk I did not have a wing folding mechanism and was therefore used primarily from land bases, with the notable exception of six aircraft of 882 Sqn aboard Illustrious from March 1942. In April 1942 Illustrious transferred two Martlet I aircraft to HMS Archer while in port at Freetown. One of her four retained Martlet I aircraft were subsequently fitted with folding wings by ship's staff during passage to Durban. In 1940, Belgium also placed an order for at least 10 G-36A's. These were to be modified with the same changes to the French aircraft, plus the removal of the tailhook as they were to be landbased. Belgium surrendered before any aircraft were delivered and by 10 May 1940, the aircraft order was transferred to the Royal Navy.

Martlet Mk II
Before the Fleet Air Arm took on charge the Martlet Mk Is, it had already ordered 100 G-36B fighters. The British chose the Pratt & Whitney R-1830-S3C4-G engine to power this aircraft; this too had a single-stage, two-speed supercharger. The FAA decided to accept a delay in delivery to get Martlets fitted out with the Grumman-designed and patented Sto-Wing folding wing system first fitted onto U.S. Navy F4F-4 Wildcats, which were vitally important if the Martlet was to be used from the first 3 Illustrious class carriers which had elevators that were too narrow to accommodate non-folding wing aircraft. Nevertheless, the first 10 received had fixed wings. The first Martlet with folding wings was not delivered until August 1941.

In contrast to the USN F4F-3, the British aircraft were fitted with armor and self-sealing fuel tanks. The Mk II also had a larger tailwheel. For carrier operations, the "sting" tail hook and attachment point for the American single-point catapult launch system were considered important advantages. Nevertheless, the Martlets were modified to have British-style catapult spools. Deliveries of the folding-wing G-36Bs began in August 1941, with 36 shipped to the UK and 54 shipped to the Far East; they were designated "Martlet Mark II".

The majority of the Martlet Mk IIs were sent to the Far East. The six Wildcats were parked on the deck at all times. On its first voyage, it served as escort carrier for a convoy to Gibraltar. On 20 September, a German Fw 200 was shot down. On the next voyage, four Fw 200 Condors fell to the guns of the Martlets, and of the combined total, two of these five Condors were shot down by Eric "Winkle" Brown during his time aboard. Operations from Audacity also demonstrated that the fighter cover was useful against U-boats. Audacity was sunk by a U-boat on 21 December 1941, and of the pilots only Brown and one other survived, but it had already proved the usefulness of escort carriers.

In May 1942, 881 and 882 squadrons on  participated in operations against Madagascar. In August 1942, 806 NAS on  provided fighter cover for a convoy to Malta. Later in that year they participated in the landings in French North Africa.

Martlet Mk III
The first 30 F4F-3As were released for sale to Greece, after the Italian invasion in November 1940. However, at the defeat of Greece in April 1941 the aircraft had only reached Gibraltar. They were taken over by the FAA as Martlet Mk III(B). As these aircraft did not have folding wings, they were only used from land bases. They served in a shore-based role in the Western Desert.

Ten fixed-wing G-36Bs were used by the FAA as Martlet III(A).

Martlet Mk IV
The Royal Navy purchased  220 F4F-4s adapted to British requirements. The main difference was the use of a Wright R-1820-40B Cyclone in a distinctly more rounded and compact cowling, with a single double-wide flap on each side of the rear and no lip intake. These machines were named Martlet Mk IV.

Martlet Mk V
The Fleet Air Arm purchased 312 FM-1s, originally with the designation of Martlet V. In January 1944, a decision was made to retain the American names for US-supplied aircraft, redesignating the batch as the Wildcat V.

Wildcat Mk VI
The Wildcat VI was the Air Ministry name for the FM-2 Wildcat in FAA service.

Operators

 Belgian Air Force: at least 10 G-36A's ordered, never delivered, transferred to France (who then transferred them to the Royal Navy) after surrender.

 Aeronavale: 81 aircraft ordered, never delivered, transferred to Royal Navy after French defeat.

 Hellenic Air Force: 30 Martlet Mk III's ordered, delivered to Gibraltar, transferred to Royal Navy after defeat.

 Royal Canadian Navy: RCN personnel assigned to the Royal Navy , were to provide the RCN with experience in aircraft carrier operations. The RCN flew 14 Martlets as part of 881 (RN) Squadron from February–July 1945.

 Royal Navy Fleet Air Arm

 United States Navy
 United States Marine Corps

Surviving aircraft

Specifications (F4F-3)

See also

References

Notes

Citations

Bibliography
 Angelucci, Enzo. The American Fighter. Sparkford, Somerset, UK: Haynes Publishing Group, 1987. .
 Barber, S.B. Naval Aviation Combat Statistics— World War II (OPNAV-P-23V No. A129). Washington, D.C.: Air Branch, Office of Naval Intelligence, 1946.
 Brown, Eric, CBE, DCS, AFC, RN.; William Green and Gordon Swanborough. "Grumman Wildcat". Wings of the Navy, Flying Allied Carrier Aircraft of World War Two. London: Jane's Publishing Company, 1980, pp. 40–52. .
 Buttler, Tony. British Secret Projects 3: Fighters and Bombers 1935–1950. Hersham, Surrey, UK: Midland Publishing, 2004. .
 Dann, Richard S. F4F Wildcat in action, Aircraft Number 191. Carrollton, Texas: Squadron/Signal Publications, Inc., 2004. .
 Dann, Richard S. F4F Wildcat Walkaround. Carrollton, Texas: Squadron/Signal Publications, Inc., 1995. .
 Donald, David, ed. American Warplanes of World War II. London: Aerospace Publishing, 1995. .
 Drendel, Lou. U.S. Navy Carrier Fighters of World War II. Carrollton, Texas: Squadron/Signal Publications Inc., 1987. .
 Ehrman, Vlastimil. Grumman Wildcat . Prague, Czech Republic: Modelpres, 1995. .
 Ewing, Steve. Thach Weave: The Life of Jimmie Thach. Annapolis, Maryland: Naval Institute Press, 2004. .
 Ewing, Steve. Reaper Leader: The Life of Jimmy Flatley. Annapolis, Maryland: Naval Institute Press, 2002. .
 "F4F-3 Airplane Characteristics & Performance, 1942." Washington, D.C.: Bureau of Ordnance, Navy Department, 1942.
 "F4F-4 Airplane Characteristics & Performance, 1943." Washington, D.C.: Bureau of Ordnance, Navy Department, 1943.
 Green, William. Warplanes of the Second World War, Volume Four: Fighters. London: Macdonald & Co.(Publishers) Ltd., 1961 (6th impression 1969). .
 Green, William. War Planes of the Second World War, Volume Six: Floatplanes. London: Macdonald, 1962.
 Green, William and Gordon Swanborough. WW2 Fact Files: US Navy and Marine Corps Fighters. London: Macdonald and Jane's Publishers Ltd., 1976. .
 Green, William, Gordon Swanborough and Eric Brown. "Grumman's Willing Wildcat". Air Enthusiast Quarterly, Number Three, 1977, pp. 49–69. 
 Greene, Frank L. The Grumman F4F-3 Wildcat. Windsor, Berkshire, UK: Profile Publications, 1972 (reprint from 1966).
 Jackson, A.J. Blackburn Aircraft since 1909. London: Putnam, 1968. .
 Jones Ben, (ed). The Fleet Air Arm in the Second World War volume II, 1942–1943, the Fleet Air Arm in Transition: the Mediterranean, Battle of the Atlantic and the Indian Ocean. London: Routledge, 2018. .
 Jarski, Adam. F4F Wildcat, Monografie Lotnicze 20 . Gdańsk, Poland: AJ-Press, 1995. .
 Kinzey, Bert. F4F Wildcat in detail. Carrollton, Texas: Squadron/Signal Publications, Inc., 2000. .
 Kinzey, Bert. F4F Wildcat in detail & scale. Blue Ridge Summit, Pennsylvania: TAB Books Inc., 1988. .
 Kit, Mister and Jean-Pierre de Cock. Grumman F4F Wildcat . Paris: Éditions Atlas s.a., 1981. no ISBN.
 Linn, Don. F4F Wildcat in action, Aircraft Number 84. Carrollton, Texas: Squadron/Signal Publications, Inc., 1988. .
 Lundstrom, John B. The First Team and the Guadalcanal Campaign. Annapolis, Maryland: Naval Institute Press, 1994. .
 Lundstrom, John B. The First Team: Pacific Naval Air Combat from Pearl Harbor to Midway. Annapolis, Maryland: Naval Institute Press, 1984. .
 March, Daniel J. (ed). British Warplanes of World War II. London: Aerospace Publishing. 1998. .
 Mason, Tim. The Secret Years: Flight Testing at Boscombe Down 1939–1945. Manchester, UK: Hikoki, 1998. .
 Mendenhall, Charles A. Wildcats & Hellcats: Gallant Grummans in World War II. St. Paul, Minnesota: Motorbooks International, 1984. .
 O'Leary, Michael. Grumman Cats. London: Osprey Publishing Ltd., 1992. .
 O'Leary, Michael. United States Naval Fighters of World War II in Action. Poole, Dorset, UK: Blandford Press, 1980. .
 Philips, Glen. Grumman F4F Wildcat, including Grumman Martlet Mks. I-VI, Warpaint series no.9. Church End Farm, Bedfordshire, UK: Hall Park Books, 1997. No ISBN.
 Polmar, Norman. Historic Naval Aircraft. Dulles, Virginia: Potomac Books, 2004. .
 Stille, Mark. Guadalcanal 1942–43: Japan's bid to knock out Henderson Field and the Cactus Air Force (Air Campaign). Osprey Publishing, 2019. .
 Swanborough, Gordon and Peter M. Bowers. United States Navy Aircraft since 1912. London: Putnam, Second edition, 1976. .
 Thetford, Owen. British Naval Aircraft Since 1912, Fourth Edition. London: Putnam, 1978. .
 Thruelsen, Richard. The Grumman Story. Westport, Connecticut: Praeger Press, 1976.  .
 Tillman, Barrett. Hellcat, The F6F in World War II. Annapolis, Maryland: Naval Institute Press, 1979. .
 Tillman, Barrett. Wildcat Aces of World War 2. Botley, Oxford, UK: Osprey Publishing, 1995. .
 Tillman, Barrett. Wildcat: The F4F in World War II. Annapolis, Maryland: Naval & Aviation Publishing, 1990, First edition 1983. .
 Winchester, Jim. Fighter - The World's Finest Combat Aircraft - 1913 to the Present Day. Bath, UK: Parragon Publishing, 2004. .
 Wixey, Ken. "Corpulent Feline: Grumman's F4F Wildcat: Part One". Air Enthusiast, No. 68, March–April 1997, pp. 16–24. .
 Wixey, Ken. "Corpulent Feline: Grumman's F4F Wildcat: Part Two". Air Enthusiast, No. 70, July–August 1997, pp. 51–59. .
 
 Young, Edward M. "F4F Wildcat vs A6M Zero-Sen - Pacific Theater 1942 (Osprey Duel; 54)". Oxford, UK: Osprey Publishing, 2013. 
 Zbiegniewski, Andre R. and Krzysztof Janowicz. Grumman F4F Wildcat (Bilingual Polish/English). Lublin, Poland: Kagero, 2004. .

External links

 (1945) AN 01-190FB-1 Pilots Handbook of Flight Operating Instructions Navy Model FM-2 British Model Wildcat VI Airplanes
 Naval History and Heritage Command Wildcat
 Naval History and Heritage Command - F4F
 VectorSite Wildcat Entry
 How Leroy Grumman and Jake Swirbul built a high-flying company from the ground up
 Grumman Wildcat Retrieved From Lake Michigan
 Newsreel footage of FAA pilots being introduced to the Grumman Martlet
 Popular Science, February 1941 color cover of early F4F model
 Pictures from the Grumman Archive
 The Grumman Wildcat in FAA Service by Bruce Archer
 Aviation-History.com's XF4F-1 3-view drawing

F04F Wildcat
1930s United States fighter aircraft
Single-engined tractor aircraft
Mid-wing aircraft
Carrier-based aircraft
F01M Wildcat
Aircraft first flown in 1937
Retractable conventional landing gear
World War II fighter aircraft of the United States